This is a list of notable events relating to the environment in 1996. They relate to environmental law, conservation, environmentalism and environmental issues.

Events

The IPCC Second Assessment Report is published.
The woodchipping of indigenous forests in New Zealand is stopped.
The Western Shield wildlife conservation programme commences in Western Australia.
Construction of the Bakun Dam begins in the Malaysian state of Sarawak. When completed it will flood  of rainforest and displace more than 9000 indigenous people.

January 
The North Cape oil spill occurred when the tank barge North Cape and the tug Scandia grounded on Moonstone Beach in South Kingstown, Rhode Island in the United States.

February 
The Sea Empress oil spill occurred at the entrance to the Milford Haven Waterway in Pembrokeshire, Wales.

May 
The Convention of the Protection, Management and Development of the Marine and Coastal Environment of the Eastern African Region or Nairobi Convention of 1985, a regional framework agreement for marine environmental management, comes into effect.
US president Bill Clinton signed the Mercury-Containing and Rechargeable Battery Management Act.

June 
The Hazardous Substances and New Organisms Act is passed in New Zealand.

August 
US president Bill Clinton signed the Safe Drinking Water Act Amendments of 1996.
US president Bill Clinton signed the Sustainable Fisheries Act of 1996.

November 
World-renowned bird expert Tony Silva is sentenced to seven years in prison without parole for leading an illegal parrot smuggling ring.

December 
The United Nations Convention to Combat Desertification entered into force.

See also

Human impact on the environment
List of environmental issues